Prospero Intorcetta (1625-1696), known to the Chinese as Yin Duoze, was an Italian Jesuit missionary to the Qing Empire. The first to translate the works of Confucius in Europe.

Life
Prospero Intorcetta was born in Piazza Armerina, Sicily, on August 28th 1625.

Traveling with the Flemish Jesuit Philippe Couplet, he reached China in 1659. There, he mostly worked in the Jiangnan region around the lower Yangtze River.

He died on October 3rd 1696 in Hangzhou.

Works

Intorcetta studied Chinese philosophy. In 1662, he published the study of the Four Books of Confucianism in a Latin work entitled The Meaning of Chinese Wisdom. In 1667, he published the Politico-Moral Knowledge of the Chinese. In 1687, under Philippe Couplet's guidance, he worked with Christian Wolfgang Herdtrich and François de Rougemont to compile an influential Latin overview of Chinese history and translation of some of the Confucian classics under the title Confucius, Philosopher of the Chinese.

See also
 Jesuit China missions & the Chinese Rites controversy

References

Citations

Bibliography
 .
 . 
 .

External links
 Bibliographical Dictionary of Chinese Christianity

1626 births
1696 deaths
People from Piazza Armerina
17th-century Italian Jesuits
Italian sinologists
Italian Roman Catholic missionaries
Jesuit missionaries in China
Italian emigrants to China
Musicians from Sicily